Parmeshwar Adi Godrej (16 July 1945 – 10 October 2016) was an Indian philanthropist and socialite, and the wife of Adi Burjorji Godrej, chairman of the Godrej Group.

Life 
Parmeshwar was born in a Sikh family on 16 July 1945, the daughter of an army officer. Parmeshwar was educated at Yadavindra Public School, Patiala. Prior to her marriage to Adi Godrej, she was a hostess for Air India. They met when she was 17 and he was 21, and married in 1965. They had three children together: daughters Tanya Dubash and Nisa Godrej and son Pirojsha Adi Godrej.

Godrej designed costumes for actress Hema Malini in the 1975 film Dharmatma at the request of her good friend Feroz Khan who was actor, director, and producer of the same film.

Frequently described as one of India's premier socialites and philanthropists,  she focused her considerable influence in the health fields. One of the earliest champions of AIDS and HIV awareness in India, she partnered with Hollywood actor Richard Gere in 2004 to launch the Heroes Project with strong support from both the Bill and Melinda Gates Foundation and Clinton Global Initiative. She also sat on the boards of both the Gere Foundation and the Bill and Melinda Gates Foundation.

Death
Parmeshwar Godrej died on 10 October 2016 at Breach Candy Hospital at age 71 due to a degenerative lung disease.

References

Indian billionaires
Indian socialites
Godrej Group
1940s births
2016 deaths
Godrej family